Nizar Tawfiq Qabbani (21 March 1923 – 30 April 1998) was a Syrian diplomat, poet, writer and publisher. He is considered to be Syria's National Poet. His poetic style combines simplicity and elegance in exploring themes of love, eroticism, religion, and Arab empowerment against foreign imperialism and local dictators. Qabbani is one of the most revered contemporary poets in the Arab world.

Biography

Early life

Nizar Qabbani was born in the Syrian capital of Damascus to a middle class merchant family. Qabbani was raised in Mi'thnah Al-Shahm, one of the neighborhoods of Old Damascus and studied at the National Scientific College School in Damascus between 1930 and 1941. The school was owned and run by his father's friend, Ahmad Munif al-Aidi. He later studied law at Damascus University, which was called Syrian University until 1958. He graduated with a bachelor's degree in law in 1945.

While a student in college he wrote his first collection of poems entitled The Brunette Told Me, which he published in 1942. It was a collection of romantic verses that made several startling references to a woman's body, sending shock waves throughout the conservative society in Damascus. To make it more acceptable, Qabbani showed it to Munir al-Ajlani, the minister of education who was also a friend of his father and a leading nationalist leader in Syria. Ajlani liked the poems and endorsed them by writing the preface for Nizar's first book.

Diplomatic career
After graduating from law school, Qabbani worked for the Syrian Foreign Ministry, serving as Consul or cultural attaché in several capital cities, including Beirut, Cairo, Istanbul, Madrid, and London. In 1959, when the United Arab Republic was formed, Qabbani was appointed Vice-Secretary of the UAR for its embassies in China. He wrote extensively during these years and his poems from China were some of his finest. He continued to work in diplomacy until he tendered his resignation in 1966.

Poetic influences 
At the age of fifteen, Nizar Qabbani’s sister died due to contested reasons. When asked whether he was a revolutionary, the poet answered: “Love in the Arab world is like a prisoner, and I want to set (it) free. I want to free the Arab soul, sense, and body with my poetry. The relationships between men and women in our society are not healthy.”

In 1981, Nizar Qabbani’s wife, Balqees, died in a bombing in Beirut, Lebanon, during the Lebanese civil war. The death of Balqees profoundly affected Qabbani’s psychology and poetry. He expressed his grief in an exceptionally moving poem titled Balqees. Qabbani blamed all Arab regimes for her death. 
Additionally, Qabbani used the death of his beloved Balqees to symbolize the death of Arab people in the Levant by their governments. 
"Balqees:
I ask forgiveness.
Maybe your life was for mine, a sacrifice.
I know well that
your killers’ aims
were to kill my words.
My beautiful, rest in peace.
After you, poetry will cease
and womanhood is out of place.
Generations of children flocks
Will keep asking about your long hair locks.
Generations of lovers
will read about you, the true instructor.
One day the Arabs will get it
that they killed the prophetess and the prophets."

The city of Damascus remained the most powerful muse in his poetry, most notably in the Jasmine Scent of Damascus. However, Qabbani expressed his love for all Arab citizens and cities from Mauritania extending to Iraq as one people connected by the same struggle and a rich past. In the second stanza of Umm al-Mu'tazz he said:
"Every Arab city is my mother,
Damascus, Beirut, Cairo, Baghdad, Khartoum,
Casablanca, Benghazi, Tunis, Amman, Riyadh,
Kuwait, Algiers, Abu Dhabi, and their sisters:
These are my family tree.
All of these cities brought me forth from their wombs, cave me to suck from their breasts.
And filled my pockets with grapes, figs and plums. All of them shook their date palms for me so that I could eat.
Opened their skies for me like a blue notebook so that I could write.
For this reason, I do not enter an Arab city without it calling me, "My son." 
I do not knock on the gate of an Arab city without finding my
childhood bed waiting for me.
No Arab city bleeds without my bleeding with it."

Qabbani was a vocal opponent of colonial and imperial western projects in the Middle East. Additionally, Qabbani frequently criticized Arab leaders for their corruption, oppression, and hypocrisy most notably in his poem Sultan:
"O Sultan, my master, if my clothes are ripped and torn
It is because your dogs with claws are allowed to tear me
O Sultan!
Because I dare to approach your deaf walls,
because I tried to reveal my sadness and
tribulation,
I was beaten."

Personal life

Family
Qabbani had two sisters, Wisal and Haifa; he also had three brothers: Mu'taz, Rashid, and Sabah. The latter, Sabah Qabbani, was the most famous after Nizar, becoming director of Syrian radio and TV in 1960 and Syria's ambassador to the United States in the 1980s.

Nizar Qabbani's father, Tawfiq Qabbani, was Syrian while his mother was of Turkish descent. His father had a chocolate factory; he also helped support fighters resisting the French Mandate for Syria and the Lebanon and was imprisoned many times for his views, greatly affecting the upbringing of Nizar into a revolutionary in his own right. Qabbani's grandfather, Abu Khalil Qabbani, was one of the leading innovators in Arab dramatic literature.

The family name, Qabbani, is derived from Qabban which means Steelyard balance.

Marriages
Nizar Qabbani married twice in his life. His first wife was his cousin Zahra Aqbiq; together they had a daughter, Hadba, and a son, Tawfiq. Tawfiq died due to a heart attack when he was 22 years old when he was in London. Qabbani eulogized his son in the famous poem "To the Legendary Damascene, Prince Tawfiq Qabbani". Zahra Aqbiq died in 2007. His daughter Hadba, born in 1947, was married twice, and lived in London until her death in April 2009.

His second marriage was to an Iraqi woman named Balqis al-Rawi, a schoolteacher he met at a poetry recital in Baghdad; she was killed in the 1981 Iraqi embassy bombing in Beirut during the Lebanese Civil War on 15 December 1981. Together they had a son, Omar, and a daughter, Zainab. After the death of Balqis, Qabbani did not marry again.

Late life and death
After the death of Balqees, Qabbani left Beirut. He was moving between Geneva and Paris, eventually settling in London, where he spent the last 15 years of his life.  In exile, Qabbani continued to write poems and raise controversies and arguments. Notable and controversial poems from this period in his life include When Will They Announce the Death of Arabs? and Runners. 
At the age of 75, Nizar Qabbani died in London on 30 April 1998 of a heart attack.
In his will, which he wrote in his hospital bed in London, Nizar Qabbani wrote that he wished to be buried in Damascus, which he described in his will as "the womb that taught me poetry, taught me creativity and granted me the alphabet of Jasmine." The great Arab poet was mourned by Arabs all over the world, with international news broadcasts highlighting his illustrious literary career.

Awards and tributes 
 1992–1993 Al Owais Award for Cultural & Scientific Achievements.
 On 21 March 2016, Google celebrated his 93rd birthday with a Google Doodle.

Bibliography

Poetry
Qabbani began writing poetry when he was 16 years old; at his own expense, Qabbani published his first book of poems, entitled The Brunette Told Me , while he was a law student at the University of Damascus in 1944.

Over the course of a half-century, Qabbani wrote 34 other books of poetry, including:

Childhood of a Breast (1948) 
Samba (1949) 
You Are Mine (1950) 
Poems (1956) 
My Beloved (1961) 
Drawing with Words (1966) 
Diary of an Indifferent Woman (1968) 
Savage Poems (1970) 
Book of Love (1970) 
100 Love Letters (1970) 
Poems Against The Law (1972) 
I Love You, and the Rest is to Come (1978) 
To Beirut the Feminine, With My Love (1978) 
May You Be My Love For Another Year (1978) 
I Testify That There Is No Woman But you (1979) 
Secret Diaries of Baheyya the Egyptian (1979) 
I Write the History of Woman Like So (1981) 
The Lover's Dictionary (1981) 
A Poem For Balqis (1982) 
Love Does Not Stop at Red Lights (1985) 
Insane Poems (1985)
Poems Inciting Anger (1986) 
Love Shall Remain My Lord (1987) 
The Trilogy of the Children of the Stones (1988) 
Secret Papers of a Karmathian Lover (1988) 
Biography of an Arab Executioner (1988) 
I Married You, Liberty! (1988) 
A Match in My Hand , And Your Petty Paper Nations (1989) 
No Victor Other Than Love (1989) 
Do You Hear the Cry of My Sadness? (1991) 
Marginal Notes on the Book of Defeat (1991) 
I'm One Man and You are a Tribe of Women (1992) 
Fifty Years of Praising Women (1994) 
Nizarian Variations of Arabic Maqam of Love  (1995) 
Alphabet of Jasmine (1998)

Other works 
He also composed many works of prose, such as My Story with Poetry , What Poetry Is , and Words Know Anger , On Poetry, Sex, and Revolution , Poetry is a Green Lantern ,  Birds Don't Require a Visa , I Played Perfectly and Here are my Keys  and The Woman in My Poetry and My Life , as well as one play named Republic of Madness Previously Lebanon  and lyrics of many famous songs of celebrated Arab singers, including:
Mohammed Abdel Wahab (Ayazon: does he think?)
Abdel Halim Hafez (Qareat Alfinjan: The cup reader)
Fairuz (La Tasaalouny: Don't Ask Me)
Kadhim Al-Sahir (Madrasat Alhob: School of Love)
Umm Kulthum (Alan Endi Bondoqyah: Now I Have Rifle)
Latifa (Talomony Aldunia: The universe blames me)
Majida El Roumi (Beirut Sit Aldunia: Lady of universe Beirut)
Asalah (Egdhab kama Tashaa: Get angry as you may)
Najat Al Saghira (Matha Aqool Laho?: What shall I say to him?)
Nancy Ajram (Ila Beirut aluntha: To the feminine Beirut )

And his verses would remain popular after his death, and put to song by Arab pop-music stars such as Kazem al-Saher and Latifa. However, such songs were introduced after filtering the original poems.

Other languages
Many of Qabbani's poems have also been translated into English and other foreign languages, both individually and as collections of selected works. Some of these collections include:

English
"On Entering the Sea" (1998)
"Arabian Love Poems" (1998), translated by Bassam Frangieh and Clementina R. Brown
"Republic of Love" (2002), translated by Nayef al-Kalali
"Journal of An Indifferent Woman" (2015), translated by George Nicolas El-Hage, PhD

Italian
"Poesie", a cura di G. Canova, M.A. De Luca, P. Minganti, A. Pellitteri, Istituto per l’Oriente, Roma 1976.
"Il fiammifero è in mano mia e le vostre piccole nazioni sono di carta e altri versi", a cura di V. Colombo, San Marco dei Giustiniani, Genova 2001.
"Il libro dell’amore", traduzione di M. Avino, in Antologia della letteratura araba contemporanea. Dalla nahda a oggi, a cura di M. Avino, I. Camera d’Afflitto, Alma Salem, Carocci, Roma 2015, pp. 116–117.
"Le mie poesie più belle", traduzione dall’arabo a cura di N. Salameh e S. Moresi, postfazione di P. Caridi, Jouvence, Milano 2016.

Nepali
Many of Qabbani's poems have been translated into Nepali by Suman Pokhrel, and are collected in an anthology tilled Manpareka Kehi Kavita.

Hindi
Many of Qabbani's poems are translated into Hindi by Siddheshwar Singh, Arpana Manoj, Manoj Patel, Rinu Talwar and other translators.

Russian
Evgeniy Dyakonov wrote his PhD thesis on the translation of Nizar Qabbani's poetry into Russian; Dyakonov's translations were published by Biblos Consulting, Moscow, in 2007.

See also
 List of Arabic-language poets

References

The life and times of Nizar Qabbani, The Nation, Faizan Ali Warraich, 10-October-2018, https://nation.com.pk/11-Oct-2018/the-life-and-times-of-nizar-qabbani

External links

Nizar Qabbani's books 
English Translation for some poems of Nizar Qabbani
Nizar Qabbani poems in Arabic
English translations of Nizar Qabbani poems
Qabbani in English at Poems Found in Translation
English translations of selected Qabbani works
Thoughts Inspired by PBS’s Two-Sentence Report on The Death of Syrian Poet Nizar Qabbani By Salman M. Hilmy, Washington Report on Middle East Affairs, October/November 1998, pages 74–76
 Nizar Qabbani Poems on ArabAdab.net 
 Nizar Qabbani Poems in The Other Voices International Project 
 English translations of Qabbani's poems I Decided, At Zero and I wrote on the wind.
 English translation of Marginal Notes on the Book of Defeat
NYT article about Dec 1981 bomb attack on Iraqi Embassy in Beirut: https://www.nytimes.com/1981/12/16/world/bomb-wrecks-iraqi-embassy-in-beirut.html

1923 births
1998 deaths
20th-century publishers (people)
Damascus University alumni
Feminist writers
Proponents of Islamic feminism
Male feminists
Arabic poetry
Muslim poets
People from Damascus
Syrian diplomats
Syrian feminists
Syrian Muslims
Syrian poets
20th-century poets
Syrian expatriates in the United Kingdom
Qabbani family
Syrian expatriates in Lebanon
Syrian expatriates in Egypt
Syrian expatriates in Spain
Syrian people of Turkish descent